Egmont Parish was created as a civil parish in Prince County, Prince Edward Island, Canada, during the 1764–1766 survey of Samuel Holland.

It contains the following townships:

 Lot 4
 Lot 5
 Lot 6
 Lot 7

Parishes of Prince Edward Island
Geography of Prince County, Prince Edward Island